Bogue Statinea is a stream in the U.S. state of Mississippi.

Bogue Statinea is a name derived from the Choctaw language; its name is purported to mean "little creek". A variant name is "Bogue Statinea Creek".

References

Rivers of Mississippi
Rivers of Lauderdale County, Mississippi
Mississippi placenames of Native American origin